Air sensitivity is a term used, particularly in chemistry, to denote the reactivity of chemical compounds with some constituent of air. Most often, reactions occur with atmospheric oxygen (O2) or water vapor (H2O), although reactions with the other constituents of air such as carbon monoxide (CO), carbon dioxide (CO2), and nitrogen (N2) are also possible.

Method 

A variety of air-free techniques have been developed to handle air-sensitive compounds. Two main types of equipment are gloveboxes and Schlenk lines. Glove boxes are sealed cabinets filled with an inert gas such as argon or nitrogen. Normal laboratory equipment can be set up in the glovebox, and manipulated by the use of gloves that penetrate its walls. The atmosphere can be regulated to approximately atmospheric pressure and set to be pure nitrogen or other gas with which the chemicals will not react. Chemicals and equipment can be transferred in and out via an airlock.

A Schlenk line is a vacuum and inert-gas dual-manifold that allows glassware to be evacuated and refilled with inert gas specially developed to work with air sensitive compounds. It is connected with a cold trap to prevent vapors from contaminating a rotary vane pump. The technique is modified from the double-tipped needle technique. These methods allow working in totally controlled and isolated environment.

Air-sensitive compounds 

Air-sensitive compounds are substances that would react, explode or oxidise with air, such as organometallic compounds (chemical compounds containing at least one chemical bond between a metal and carbon atom, including alkaline earth, alkaline and transition metals). They may include metalloids like tin, boron and sometimes silicon encountered in chemistry, which are sensitive to oxygen and moisture. Alkali metals and other pyrophoric compounds which react violently with water can be handled safely using air free techniques.

Some semiconductors are air-sensitive.

See also
 Hygroscopy
 Hydrophile 
 Ultrahydrophobicity

References

Air-free techniques